The Seance or The Séance may refer to:
Séance, an attempt to communicate with spirits
The Seance (album), by the Hampton Hawes Trio
The Seance (Harwood novel), a 2008 novel by John Harwood
The Seance (Lawrence novel), a 2008 novel by Iain Lawrence
"The Séance", an episode of I Love Lucy